Feebly interacting particles (FIPs) are defined by their extremely suppressed interactions with the Standard Model (SM) bosons and/or fermions. FIP candidates could be massive (FIMP) or massless and coupled to the SM particles through minimal coupling strength. The light FIPs are theorized to be dark matter candidates, and, they provides an explanation for the origin of neutrino masses and CP symmetry in strong interactions. These particles are potential thermal dark matter candidates extending the model of weakly interacting massive particles. FIP physics is also known as dark-sector physics. In February 2022 massive gravitons have been proposed as feebly Interacting particles candidates.

References 

Dark matter
Hypothetical particles
Physics beyond the Standard Model
Astroparticle physics
Exotic matter